Woodland railway station served the hamlet of Woodland, in Lancashire, England (now in Cumbria). It was on the branch line to Coniston.

History 

Authorised by Parliament in August 1857 the line to Coniston was open less than two years later in June 1859. British Railways closed the station and the branch to passengers in 1958 and goods in 1962.

The station building remains and is a private residence.

References

Sources

External links 
Woodland on a navigable 1946 O. S. map NPE maps
The station on an Edwardian 25" OS map National Library of Scotland
The station and line Rail Map Online
The station and line with mileages Railway Codes

Former Coniston Railway stations
Disused railway stations in Cumbria
Railway stations in Great Britain opened in 1859
Railway stations in Great Britain closed in 1962
1859 establishments in England